Nagarajan Muthukumar (12 July 1975 – 14 August 2016) was a Tamil poet, lyricist, and author. Best known for his Tamil language film songs, he received the most Filmfare Awards for Best Lyricist in Tamil and was a two-time recipient of the National Film Award for Best Lyrics for his works in Thanga Meenkal (2013) and Saivam (2014).

Early life
Muthukumar grew up in Kannikapuram village in Kancheepuram, India in a middle-class family. He has a brother Ramesh Kumar. At the age of six and half, he lost his mother. At a young age, he acquired an interest in reading.

Career
He began his career working under Balu Mahendra for four years. He was later offered to write lyrics in the film Veera Nadai, directed by Seeman. He has been credited as a dialogue writer in a few films, including Kireedam (2007) and Vaaranam Aayiram (2008). His last movie as lyricist is Sarvam Thaala Mayam with A.R.Rahman.

Personal life
Na. Muthukumar was born at Kannikapuram, Kancheepuram on 12 July 1975. He did his graduation in Physics at Kancheepuram Pachaippa college. He pursued his master's degree in Tamil at Chennai Pachaippa college. With the aim of becoming a director, he joined as an assistant director to the legendary Balumahendra. His Poem 'Thoor' took him to great heights.

On 14 June 2006, he married Jeevalakshmi in Vadapalani, Chennai.

Health issues and death
Muthukumar, who had been suffering from jaundice for a long time, died on the morning of 14 August 2016, at his Chennai residence of cardiac arrest. He is survived by his wife, son and daughter.

Filmography

Lyricist

Television
 1999 Jeyipathu Nijam
 2005 En Thozhi En Kadhali En Manaivi....
 2011 Appanum Aathalum
 2013 Vaidehi

Dialogues
 Kireedam
 Jagatheswaran

Publications
 Dhoosigal (Poems)
 Pattampoochi Virpavan (Poems)
 Newtonin Moondram Vidhi (Poems collection)
 Graamam Nagaram Maanagaram (Essays)
 AAna AAvanna (Poems)
 Aniladum Mundril (Essays)
 Vedikkai Paarpavan

Awards
 2005: Tamil Nadu State Film Award for Best Lyricist - Ghajini
 2006: Filmfare Best Lyricist Award (Tamil) - Veyil
 2007: Vijay Award for Best Lyricist - Sivaji: The Boss
 2009: Vijay Award for Best Lyricist - Siva Manasula Sakthi
 2009: Filmfare Best Lyricist Award (Tamil) - Ayan
 2010: Vijay Music Award for Best Lyricist - Veppam
 2011: SIIMA Award for Best Lyricist for "Un Pera Theriyathe" - Engaeyum Eppothum
 2012: Tamil Nadu State Film Award for Best Lyricist - 'Multiple films
 2013: National Film Award for Best Lyrics for "Ananda Yaazhai" - Thangameengal
 2013: Tamil Nadu State Film Award for Best Lyricist - Thangameengal
 2013: Vijay Award for Best Lyricist - "Dheivangal Ellam" - Kedi Billa Killadi Ranga
 2013: SIIMA Award for Best Lyricist for "Ananda Yaazhai" - Thangameengal
 2013: Filmfare Best Lyricist Award (Tamil) for "Ananda Yaazhai" - Thangameengal
 2014: National Film Award for Best Lyrics for "Azhage" - Saivam
 2014: Tamil Nadu State Film Award for Best Lyricist - Saivam
 2014: Filmfare Award South for Best Lyrics for "Azhage" - Saivam

References

External links
 

1975 births
2016 deaths
Tamil film poets
Dravidian movement
Indian male poets
Indian lyricists
Filmfare Awards South winners
People from Kanchipuram district
Poets from Tamil Nadu
21st-century Indian poets
21st-century Indian male writers
Best Lyrics National Film Award winners